The Freedom Party of Victoria is a minor party registered in the Australian state of Victoria. Founded and registered in 2022, the party’s stated vision is: “A state whereby personal freedom is central, government power is limited, the rule of law applies equally to everyone and individual potential is limited only by ones' imagination. This will be delivered by a secure leadership who are focused on serving and governing, not managing and controlling.”

The party emerged out of the protests to the response from the state government during the COVID-19 pandemic, and features many candidates that hold anti-vaccine, anti-lockdown and anti-mandate views. The party's leader is Morgan Jonas, an anti-vaccine, anti-lockdown campaigner and former candidate of the United Australia Party (UAP). The party's deputy leader is former Liberal National (LNP) Queensland politician Aidan McLindon.

The party contested the 2022 Victorian state election and the 2023 Narracan state by-election.

References

External links 
  

 
Conservative parties in Australia
Political parties established in 2022  
2022 establishments in Australia
Anti-vaccination organizations
Organizations established for the COVID-19 pandemic
Impact of the COVID-19 pandemic on politics